Douglas Caine is an American psychologist and an addiction treatment professional, he is the founder of the rehabilitation facility Sober Champion. Many of his clients are Hollywood celebrities and the wealthy.

About 
In 2005, Caine opened a boutique sober coaching firm called Sober Champion. In 2007, he traveled to New York City and London, trained staff there and opened UK Sober Champion and New York Sober Companion. More recently, he traveled to Chicago and launched a local operation: Chicago Sober Champion.

After completion of his doctorate in Clinical Psychology, Dr. Caine opened a non-traditional mental health counseling practice in Santa Monica. Currently, he greets a wide variety of conditions in private practice, Connect With Douglas.

References

Living people
Year of birth uncertain
Addiction organizations in the United States
Year of birth missing (living people)